Thomas Reid (born circa. 1901; date of death unknown) was a Scottish footballer who played as a forward for Ayr United, Port Vale, Clapton Orient, Northwich Victoria, and New Brighton.

Career
Reid played for North Stevenson United and Ayr United (First Division) – also having trials with Clyde, Albion Rovers and Dundee – before joining Port Vale in August 1922. His debut came in a 3–0 defeat to Wolverhampton Wanderers at Molineux on 2 April 1923. He scored his first goal in the Football League 12 days later, in a 1–0 win over Barnsley at Oakwell. Having played the last six Second Division games of the 1922–23 season, he went on to feature 18 times in the 1923–24 campaign, and found the net against Bury and South Shields. However Reid fell out of the first team picture at The Old Recreation Ground, and played just one game in both the 1924–25 and 1925–26 seasons. He was sold on to league rivals Clapton Orient for £230 in January 1927. He later played for Northwich Victoria (Cheshire County League) and New Brighton.

Career statistics
Source:

References

1900s births
Year of death missing
Footballers from North Lanarkshire
Scottish footballers
Association football forwards
Ayr United F.C. players
Port Vale F.C. players
Leyton Orient F.C. players
Northwich Victoria F.C. players
New Brighton A.F.C. players
Scottish Football League players
English Football League players